Banana Republic (1979) is a live album of Italian singer-songwriters Francesco De Gregori and Lucio Dalla. It was recorded during their tour of 1979 and released by RCA Italia. Ron collaborated to the arrangements, and also was present as singer in the film shot during the tour.

Track listing
"Banana Republic"
"Un gelato al limon"
"La canzone di Orlando"
"Bufalo Bill"
"Piazza Grande"
"4/3/1943"
"Santa Lucia"
"Quattro cani" 
"Addio a Napoli" 
"Ma come fanno i marinai"

Personnel
 Francesco De Gregori: guitar, vocals
 Ricky Portera, George Sims: guitars, backing vocals
 Ron: piano, guitar, backing vocals
 Gaetano Curreri: piano, Hammond organ, mellotron
 Fabio Liberatori: Minimoog, Fender Rhodes
 Giovanni Pezzoli: drums, percussion
 Franco Di Stefano: drums, percussion
 Lucio Dalla: sax, clarinet, piano, vocals
 Marco Nanni: bass, backing vocals

Francesco De Gregori albums
Lucio Dalla albums
1979 live albums
RCA Records live albums